Eşref Apak (born 3 January 1982 in Kalecik, Ankara) is a Turkish hammer thrower. Apak was a member of Fenerbahçe Athletics in Istanbul then transferred to Enkaspor, where he was coached by Artun Talay.

Apak took part at the 2004 Summer Olympics in Athens and won a surprising bronze medal with 79.51 m after the gold medalist Hungarian athlete Adrián Annus was disqualified by IOC for a doping violation. In 2005 Apak participated at the 2005 Mediterranean Games in Almería and won the gold medal.

Eşref Apak is married to sprinter Sema Aydemir, and the couple has a son Ali.

He served a 2-year doping ban for the use of a prohibited substance, Stanozolol. The ban lasted from 8 June 2013 to 25 June 2015.

Achievements

References

External links
 

1982 births
Living people
Turkish hammer throwers
Male hammer throwers
Athletes (track and field) at the 2004 Summer Olympics
Athletes (track and field) at the 2008 Summer Olympics
Athletes (track and field) at the 2012 Summer Olympics
Athletes (track and field) at the 2016 Summer Olympics
Olympic athletes of Turkey
Olympic bronze medalists for Turkey
Medalists at the 2004 Summer Olympics
Sportspeople from Ankara
Fenerbahçe athletes
Enkaspor athletes
Gazi University alumni
Doping cases in athletics
Turkish sportspeople in doping cases
World Athletics Championships athletes for Turkey
Turkish male athletes
Olympic bronze medalists in athletics (track and field)
Mediterranean Games gold medalists for Turkey
Athletes (track and field) at the 2005 Mediterranean Games
Universiade medalists in athletics (track and field)
Mediterranean Games medalists in athletics
Universiade silver medalists for Turkey
Medalists at the 2005 Summer Universiade
Islamic Solidarity Games competitors for Turkey
Athletes (track and field) at the 2020 Summer Olympics
Olympic male hammer throwers
21st-century Turkish people